Marc Guillemot is a French professional offshore sailor born on 25 June 1959 in Quimper. In 2009 he was awarded knight of the order of merit.

Career highlights

References

External links
 Official Facebook Page 
 Official Website Page

1959 births
Living people
Sportspeople from Quimper
French male sailors (sport)
IMOCA 60 class sailors
French Vendee Globe sailors
2008 Vendee Globe sailors
2012 Vendee Globe sailors
Vendée Globe finishers
Single-handed circumnavigating sailors
Knights of the Ordre national du Mérite